Charles Borland Jr. (June 29, 1786 – February 23, 1852) was an American politician and a U. S. representative from New York.

Biography
Born in Minisink, Orange County, New York Borland graduated from Union College in 1811. Then he studied law, was admitted to the bar, and began his practice. He married Matilda Decker and they had five children, Adeline, Emerson, Thomas, Charles, and Dolly Ann.

Career
Borland was a member of the New York State Assembly in 1820–21.

He was elected as a Democratic-Republican to the 17th United States Congress, to fill the vacancy caused by the death of Selah Tuthill, holding office from December 3, 1821, to March 3, 1823.

He was District Attorney of Orange County from 1835 to 1841; and again a member of the State Assembly in 1836. He was President of the Board of Trustees of the Village of Montgomery for ten years.

Death
Borland died in Ward's Bridge, Orange County, New York, on February 23, 1852 (age 65 years, 239 days). He is interred at Riverside Cemetery, Montgomery.

References

External links

The New York Civil List compiled by Franklin Benjamin Hough (pages 71, 197, 218, 260 and 378; Weed, Parsons and Co., 1858)
The Political Graveyard

Govtrack US Congress

1786 births
1852 deaths
Union College (New York) alumni
Members of the New York State Assembly
People from Orange County, New York
County district attorneys in New York (state)
Democratic-Republican Party members of the United States House of Representatives from New York (state)
19th-century American politicians